The mammillothalamic tract (mammillothalamic fasciculus, thalamomammillary fasciculus, bundle of Vicq d’Azyr) arises from cells in both the medial and lateral nuclei of the mammillary body and by fibers that are directly continued from the fornix.

The mammillothalamic tract then connects the mammillary body to the dorsal tegmental nuclei, the ventral tegmental nuclei, and the anterior thalamic nuclei.

Structure

The mammillothalamic tract was first described by the French physician, Félix Vicq d'Azyr, from whom it takes its alternate name (bundle of Vicq d'Azyr). There, axons divide within the gray matter; the coarser branches pass into the anterior nucleus of the thalamus as the bundle of Vicq d’Azyr. The finer branches pass downward as the mammillotegmental bundle of Gudden. The bundle of Vicq d’Azyr spreads fan-like as it terminates in the medial dorsal nucleus. Some fibers pass through the dorsal nucleus to the angular nucleus of the thalamus. ("The term 'angular thalamic nucleus' refers to a group of cells ventral to the lateral dorsal nucleus of thalamus."). The axons from these nuclei form part of the thalamocortical radiations.

Function
The mammillary bodies directly or indirectly connect to the amygdala, hippocampus, and thalami as major structures in the limbic system. The mammillothalamic tract carries signals from the mammillary bodies via the anterior thalamus to support spatial memory.

Clinical significance
Infarction of the region including the mammillothalamic tract has been associated with alcoholic Korsakoff syndrome.

See also
 Hypothalamotegmental tract
 Papez circuit

References

External links
  - "mammillothalamic tract"
  - "mammillothalamic tract of hypothalamus"
  - "mammillothalamic tract of thalamus"
 https://web.archive.org/web/20080505050804/http://isc.temple.edu/neuroanatomy/lab/atlas/dan2/

Limbic system
Thalamic connections